Jone Tiko (born 16 October 1994) is a Fijian rugby union player, currently playing for the . His preferred position is prop.

Professional career
Tiko was named in the Fijian Drua squad for Round 8 of the 2022 Super Rugby Pacific season.

References

External links
itsrugby.co.uk Profile

1994 births
Living people
Fijian rugby union players
Rugby union props
Fijian Drua players